Van der Zande is a Dutch surname. Notable people with the surname include:

Janus van der Zande (1924–2016), Dutch marathon runner
Renger van der Zande (born 1986), Dutch racing driver

See also
Van de Sande

Dutch-language surnames